Henton is a hamlet in Oxfordshire, about  west of Princes Risborough in Buckinghamshire. Henton is in the civil parish of Chinnor, just off the Icknield Way, which has been a road since the Iron Age.

Railway
In 1869–72 the Watlington and Princes Risborough Railway was built past Henton. British Railways withdrew passenger services and closed the halt in 1957. The line remained open for freight as far as Chinnor cement works until 1989. In 1994 the Chinnor and Princes Risborough Railway Association reopened this section of line as a heritage railway. The association has not reinstated Wainhill Crossing Halt.

Amenities

Henton has a hotel and restaurant, the Peacock.
It also has a bed and breakfast, Manor Farm Cottage.

Gallery

Notes

Sources

External links

Villages in Oxfordshire